Enrique María Repullés, (30 October 1845 – 13 September 1922 in Madrid) was a Spanish architect.

He was a member of the Real Academia de Bellas Artes de San Fernando along with Narciso Pascual Colomer and Ricardo Velázquez Bosco.

Work in Madrid
He was responsible for important buildings in Madrid, such as the neo-classical Madrid Stock Exchange and the neo-mudéjar Iglesia de Santa Cristina (near the Puerta del Ángel) (1904-6). He carried out work in the grounds of the Palacio Real at the Plaza de la Armería and the Campo del Moro.

Work outside Madrid
He also designed buildings in the provinces such as the Casa Consistorial of Valladolid (1892-1908) and the Basílica de Santa Teresa in Alba de Tormes, Province of Salamanca.

References

External links

Spanish architects
1845 births
1922 deaths